Kimpinen Sports Centre is an athletics stadium in Lappeenranta, Finland. The stadium is used by, for example,  PEPO football team, Rajaritarit American football team  and Lappeenrannan Urheilu-Miehet athletics team.

External links
Kimpisen urheilukeskus in Lappeenranta's web site

Lappeenranta
Buildings and structures in South Karelia
Sports venues in Finland